Xinzhuang railway station is a railway station located in East District, Hsinchu City, Taiwan. It is located on the Neiwan line and is operated by Taiwan Railways.

When the station opened in 2011, it was named Zhuke railway station, after the Hsinchu Science Park. However, the name was met with controversy from locals, who wanted the station name to reflect local culture. The name was changed to Xinzhuang in January 2013.

References

2011 establishments in Taiwan
Railway stations opened in 2011
Railway stations in Hsinchu
Railway stations served by Taiwan Railways Administration